Abū Muḥammad al-Ḥasan ibn Zayd ibn al-Ḥasan ibn ʿAlī ibn Abī Ṭālib (died 783), was a notable Alid who served as governor of Medina under al-Mansur.

Hasan was the grandson of Hasan ibn Ali, the firstborn son of Ali and Fatimah, the daughter of Muhammad. A pious man, he emulated his father and grandfather in not meddling with the power struggles for the Caliphate, and unlike many Alids he acquiesced to the Abbasids' seizure of power after the Abbasid Revolution. The first Abbasid Caliph, al-Saffah, married his daughter, and allowed Hasan to live at the court. In 767, al-Saffah's successor al-Mansur appointed Hasan as governor of the holy city of Medina, but dismissed him in 772 after the two fell out, and confiscated his wealth. After al-Mansur died in 775, the new Caliph, al-Mahdi, restored Hasan to his possessions. Hasan died during the hajj  to Mecca in 783, and was buried at al-Hajir.

Sources 
 

783 deaths
Abbasid governors of Medina
Year of birth unknown
8th-century Arabs
8th-century people from the Abbasid Caliphate
Hasanids